Стенка на Стенку (Stenka na Stenku) is an EP by the Russian folk metal band Arkona. It was released on 25 May 2011 through Napalm Records.

Track listing

Album description
The title track is about a type of group fist fights once popular in Russia, called Wall Against wall. This topic is reflected in the EP's cover and the video which was shot for the track.

Stenka na stenku was featured on the group's album Slovo, while the rest are non-album tracks.

Personnel
 Masha "Scream" – vocals, keyboards, tambourine, khomuz, shaman drums, choir, shamanic guttural vocals on "Goi, Rode, Goi!"
 Sergei "Lazar" – guitars, acoustic guitars, balalaika
 Vladimir "Volk" – gaita gallega, blockflute, whistle, zhaleyka
 Ruslan "Kniaz" – bass
 Vlad "Artist" – drums

Guest musicians
 Irina "Lisa" – cello on "Goi, Rode, Goi!"
 Ilya "Wolfenhirt" (Svarga) – choir
 Aleksandr "Shmel" (Rarog) – choir
 Aleksandr Oleinikov – accordion
 Philipp "Freki" Seiler (Varg) – guest vocals on "Skål!"

References

External links
 
 Nuclear Blast

2011 albums
Arkona (band) albums
Napalm Records EPs